Bojničky is a village and municipality in Hlohovec District in the Trnava Region of western Slovakia.

History
In historical records the village was first mentioned in 1113.

Geography
The municipality lies at an altitude of 200 metres and covers an area of 9.268 km². It has a population of about 1290 people.

It is around a 10-minute car journey from the neighbouring town of Hlohovec and it is served by a regular bus route from Hlohovec. To give some context as to the proximity of Bojničky and Hlohovec, the elevated photo on the Wikipedia article of Hlohovec was taken from a viewpoint within walking distance from the edge of Bojničky along the road the connects Bojničky to Hlohovec.

Some people from Bojničky work in Hlohovec.

It is also possible to commute the 45 minute by car journey to Bratislava, the capital of Slovakia, from Bojničky.

As at December 2011, around 5 new houses were in the process of being built in Bojničky by individuals.

Genealogical resources

The records for genealogical research are available at the state archive "Statny Archiv in Bratislava, Slovakia"

 Roman Catholic church records (births/marriages/deaths): 1712-1895 (parish B)

See also
 List of municipalities and towns in Slovakia

References

External links
https://web.archive.org/web/20071116010355/http://www.statistics.sk/mosmis/eng/run.html
Surnames of living people in Bojnicky

Villages and municipalities in Hlohovec District